Geraldine Duque Mantilla (born September 21, 1991) is a Venezuelan model, lawyer and beauty pageant titleholder who was titled as Miss Supranational Venezuela 2017. Duque represented Venezuela in Miss Supranational 2017.

Life and career

Early life
Geraldine was born in San Cristóbal, Táchira. She obtained a law degree from the Universidad Católica del Táchira in San Cristóbal.

Pageantry
One of Duque's first participations in beauty contests was when she participated and obtained the titles of Binational University Queen 2013, representing the Gran Colombia University Institute, and as the Queen of Tourism of the San Sebastián International Fair 2013.

Miss Venezuela 2016 
Geraldine was also shortlisted as one of the official candidates for Miss Miranda 2016 contest, representing the Lander municipality, heading for Miss Venezuela 2016. However, she did not advance in the qualifying rounds.

Miss Supranational Venezuela 2017 
Duque was the one who applied herself directly to the international organization of Miss Supranational, acquiring the rights to the franchise for her participation to represent Venezuela in the Miss Supranational 2017 competition.

Miss Supranational 2017 
She represented Venezuela in the Miss Supranational 2017 pageant, which was held on December 1, 2017 at the MOSIR Arena, in Krynica-Zdrój, Poland. For her typical costume, Geraldine chose to represent an allegory of the orchid, the Venezuelan national flower. However, Duque could not qualify in the semifinalists group, this being the sixth and last time that the South American nation failed in this feat.

However, Duque won the special awards for Best Talent Show, thanks to a flamenco demonstration and Best Gala Dress, as Miss Elegance.

Another projects 
Duque has stood out as a prominent fashion influencer and consultant. In 2018, Duque created her own clothing collection. In addition, she started the publication of a digital magazine focused on women with a view to empowerment and personal and professional growth.

References

External links
 

1991 births
Living people
Miss Venezuela winners
People from Táchira
Venezuelan female models